Paigah is a town and union council of Dera Ghazi Khan District in the Punjab province of Pakistan. It is located at 29°58'0N 70°39'0E and has an altitude of 115 metres (380 feet).

References

Populated places in Dera Ghazi Khan District
Union councils of Dera Ghazi Khan District
Cities and towns in Punjab, Pakistan